William Clifford Richards (28 March 1901 – 13 February 1964) was a Welsh international rugby union wing who played club rugby for Pontypool and Swansea and represented Wales at international level. Richards was a coal miner by trade, and worked in the pits all his adult life. In 1964, while working at the Navigation Colliery in Crumlin, he was killed in an underground accident.

Rugby career
Richards was first capped for Wales while playing first class rugby for Pontypool. His first international game was against England in the opening Welsh match of the 1922 Five Nations Championship. Under the captaincy of Tom Parker, Wales were convincing winners over a far more experienced England, running in eight tries, of which Richards scored one. The 1922 Wales Championship team, captained by Tom Parker, was noted for its stability, with only two changes throughout the entire campaign. Richards played in all four matches, though was initially dropped for the final match of the tournament against France. The selectors had originally chosen Frank Palmer and Harold Davies, but switched to Richards and Islwyn Evans, just minutes before kick-off, as they believed they would be better suited to the harder French sun-baked pitch. At the end of the Championship, Wales won three games and drew the match against Scotland, lifting the tournament as out-right winners.

Richards played one final game for Wales, when he faced Ireland at the Cardiff Arms Park, in the third Welsh match of the 1924 Five Nations Championship. Although Richards scored the second try of his international career, Wales still lost the game and Richards was not selected for Wales again.

International matches played
Wales
  1922
  1922
  1922, 1924
  1922

Bibliography

References

1901 births
1964 deaths
Accidental deaths in Wales
Industrial accident deaths
Pontypool RFC players
Rugby union players from Caerphilly County Borough
Rugby union wings
Swansea RFC players
Wales international rugby union players
Welsh miners
Welsh rugby union players